The Royal Commission Into Whether There Has Been Corrupt or Criminal Conduct By Any Western Australian Police Officer, commonly known as the Kennedy Royal Commission, was a Royal Commission established in 2002 by the state government of Western Australia to determine whether any officer of the Western Australia Police had engaged in corrupt or criminal conduct. The commission issued an interim report on 20 December 2002 and a final report on 30 January 2004.
 
The commissioner was Hon. G. A. Kennedy QC.  Establishment of the commission arose from widespread public concern over the behaviour and integrity of the Western Australia Police.  The terms of reference required inquiry into factual matters and the effectiveness of police procedures.

The final report of the commission concluded that:

... the full range of corrupt or criminal conduct from stealing to assaults, perjury, drug dealing and the improper disclosure of confidential information have been examined.  [the Western Australian Police force] has been ineffective in monitoring those events and modifying its procedures to deal with that conduct and to prevent its repetition. ... The fact that there remain in WAPS a number of officers who participated in this conduct, and who not only refused to admit it, but also uniformly denied it with vehemence, is a matter of concern.

A principal recommendation was that a Crime and Corruption Commission be established as an oversight body in a system where "the Commissioner of Police should retain the primary responsibility for managing the discipline of the Police Service".

References

 Draft terms of reference at Legislative Assembly Hansard, 11 October 2000. Page 1926 (pdf page 21)
 Royal Commission Into Whether There Has Been Corrupt Or Criminal Conduct By Any Western Australian Police Officer - Interim Report, December 2002, at State Law Publisher, Western Australia. Accessed 17 March 2012
 Final Report Vol. 1, Part 1, 30 January 2004, at Parliament of Western Australia
 Final Report Vol. 1, Part 2, 30 January 2004, at Parliament of Western Australia
 Final Report Vol. 2, Part 1, 30 January 2004, at Parliament of Western Australia
 Final Report Vol. 2, Part 2, 30 January 2004, at Parliament of Western Australia
 Final Report—Finance and Administration from 1 July 2003 to 30 June 2004, 6 August 2004, at Parliament of Western Australia tabled papers. Accessed 17 March 2012

2004 in Australia
History of Western Australia
Law enforcement in Australia
Police
Perth Mint Swindle
2000s in Western Australia